American Mullet (also known as The Mullet Chronicles) is a 2001 documentary film directed by Jennifer Arnold. The film documents the phenomenon of the mullet hairstyle and the people who wear it. Through their discussion of the mullet, the backgrounds of the people featured in the film are revealed.

References

External links

2001 films
American documentary films
2001 documentary films
Films about fashion
2000s English-language films
2000s American films